Trubia is a parish of the municipality of Oviedo, Asturias, Spain.

It is located in the confluence of rivers Nalón and Trubia, giving the last one its name to the location.

History
In the 19th century, the Royal Weapons Factory of Trubia was established and provoked an important increase in the population of the parish. This factory is still in use today.

In 1885, as Pintoria and Udrión, Trubia left the municipality of Grado and was annexed to Oviedo.

References

Parishes in Oviedo